The Planetary Science Journal is a peer-reviewed open access scientific journal of astrophysics and astronomy, established in 2020. It is published by IOP Publishing on behalf of the American Astronomical Society. The founding editor-in-chief is Faith Vilas (Planetary Science Institute)

Abstracting and indexing
The journal is abstracted and indexed in Inspec and Scopus.

References

External links

Astrophysics journals
Planetary science journals
IOP Publishing academic journals
English-language journals
American Astronomical Society academic journals
Online-only journals